Herndon Career Center is a career and technical high school in Raytown, Missouri, United States.

It is operated by the Raytown C-2 School District.

Cheryl Reichert is director of the school.

References

External links

Schools in Jackson County, Missouri
High schools in Jackson County, Missouri
Public high schools in Missouri